The 2008 Formula D season (officially titled Castrol Syntec Power Cup) was the fifth season for the Formula D series. The series began April 12, 2008 and concluded on October 11. The highest scoring drivers of the series were invited to a non-point scoring All-Star event to compete with other drivers from other series all over the world on November 16, 2008.

Schedule

Championship standings
Event winners in bold.

Honors
Rookie of the Year
 Michihiro Takatori
Most improved driver
Stephan Verdier
Driver of the Year
Ryan Tuerck
Hardest Charging Driver
Robbie Nishida
Spirit of Drifting
Patrick Mordaunt
Superstar of the Year
Tanner Foust
Best Style
Daijiro Yoshihara

References

Formula D seasons
Formula D